Conquest of the Air is a 1936 documentary film or docudrama on the history of aviation up to that time. The film features historical footage, and dramatic re-creations, of the developments of commercial and military aviation; including the early stages of technology developments in design, propulsion, and air navigation aids. The film was a London Films production, commissioned by the British Air Ministry.

Synopsis

Cast
 Frederick Culley as Roger Bacon
 Laurence Olivier as Vincent Lunardi
 Franklin Dyall as Jerome de Ascoli
 Henry Victor as Otto Lilienthal
 Hay Petrie as Tiberius Cavallo
 John Turnbull as Ferdinand Von Zeppelin
 Charles Lefeaux as Louis Bleriot
 Bryan Powley as Sir George Cayley
 Alan Wheatley as Giovanni Alfonso Borelli
 John Abbott as Jean-François Pilâtre de Rozier

Production background
The film was initially commissioned by Alexander Korda prior to the advent of World War II, and the Air Ministry saw the value in promoting Britain's contribution and leadership in aviation during this period. Some notable footage is featured of the early phases of automated flight, navigational equipment, and the transitions between civil and military developments, including heavy bombers; fast fighter aircraft; and the advent of naval aviation (aircraft carrier), plus the initial experiments with vertical rotary flight (helicopters).

An updated version was released in 1940 and released in the United States on 20 May 1940.

See also
 List of films in the public domain in the United States

References

External links
 
 
 

British documentary films
History of aviation
British aviation films
1936 films
London Films films
Air Ministry
1936 in aviation
1936 in military history
1936 in the United Kingdom
Films produced by Alexander Korda
British black-and-white films
British docudrama films
1936 documentary films
1936 drama films
British drama films
1930s British films